Atom String Quartet is a string quartet that specializes in jazz, and is the first such band in Poland. In June 2011 the quartet’s album “Fade in” was released, which was a live concert that was recorded on Radio Katowice. It received a “Fryderyk” in “Jazz debut” category.

Current members
 Dawid Lubowicz - violin
  - violin
 Michal Zaborski - viola
  - cello

Discography

 Fade In (Polskie Radio Katowice - 2011)
 Fade In (Kayax - 2012)
 Places (Kayax - 2012)

Video recordings

 Atom String Quartet Live in Skwer (TVP Kultura - 2010)

Awards

External links

 
 Atom String Quartet on Facebook

Musical groups established in 2010
Polish jazz ensembles
String quartets
2010 establishments in Poland